The Gabriel River (in French: rivière Gabriel) is a tributary of the east bank of the rivière du Pin which flows northward to the south bank of the rivière du Sud (Montmagny); the latter flows north-east to the south shore of the St. Lawrence River, in the administrative region of Chaudière-Appalaches, Quebec, Canada .

Toponymy 
The toponym Rivière Gabriel was formalized on December 5, 1968, at the Commission de toponymie du Québec.

See also 

 List of rivers of Quebec

References 

Rivers of Chaudière-Appalaches
Bellechasse Regional County Municipality
Montmagny Regional County Municipality